Kaplityny  is a village in the administrative district of Gmina Barczewo, within Olsztyn County, Warmian-Masurian Voivodeship, in northern Poland.

The village has a population of 350.

References

Kaplityny